Robert Dukes (born March 8, 1968) is an American vocalist, best known as the former lead singer for the thrash metal band Exodus and current vocalist for his crossover thrash project Generation Kill.

Early life 
Dukes was born in Florida on March 8, 1968, living in Queens, New York City before moving to Nyack, New York, north of Manhattan. He describes his parents as being "kinda hippies" who regularly played records by artists such as The Doors, Black Sabbath and Jimi Hendrix, which was the music he grew up on.

Career

Exodus (2004–2014) 
After parting with a band he was part of in New York, Dukes rode his motorcycle on a five-month, 11,000 mile trip to California, with no idea of career prospects. Despite considering a career as a scuba diving instructor, Dukes ended up working as a guitar tech after living in Hollywood for two months. He met and befriended Jeff Hickey, a longtime friend of Exodus. While working for Exodus, Dukes played a demo tape that he composed in 1996 to guitarist Rick Hunolt and drummer Tom Hunting, with no expectation of joining the band. After Steve Souza's departure in 2004, Dukes was asked to audition and ultimately hired as the band's new vocalist and would make his debut on the 2005 album Shovel Headed Kill Machine. He would appear on the next three studio albums, one of which being 2008's Let There Be Blood, a re-recorded version of 1985's Bonded by Blood.

On June 8, 2014, Exodus split with Dukes and reunited with Souza thereafter. Dukes lashed out at his former bandmates and said that he had not spoken to them since his departure and addressed a 20-second phone call conversation he had with drummer Tom Hunting about the band's reunion with Souza. He blamed Testament vocalist Chuck Billy and their management for his dismissal. Billy denied responsibility, but suggested for Exodus to either find a new vocalist or return to Souza: "it made sense, but it wasn't me pushing it. It was just me presenting it to the guys, and the guys made the decision." Dukes recalled that there was no passion in the music before his departure and also criticized the material that the band was working on at the time, calling it "regurgitated shit that we had just done and done over and over again". He then explained that he experienced pressure towards the end of his time in Exodus, as he became a newlywed and was moving into a new home.

On July 8, 2017, Dukes rejoined with Exodus to perform with them as part of a two-night stint event in San Francisco. He said that he's "totally at peace" over his firing and that performing with the band again "was a lot of fun, man; it was a lot of laughs. The show was great." He has since restored his friendship with the band.

In a January 2019 interview, Dukes took ownership over his role in his deteriorating relationship with Exodus, crediting his conversation with Megadeth bassist David Ellefson and T.S.O.L. vocalist Jack Grisham.

Generation Kill (2008–present) 
Dukes, on hiatus from touring with Exodus, wanted to funnel his excess creative energy and aggression into something new. After the inclusion of Jason Trenczer, Lou Lehman and Sam Inzerra, the band began writing and recording their first album, Red, White and Blood, featuring several hit singles such as "Feast for the Wolves" and "Hate" as well as a cover of the Nine Inch Nails song "Wish" which enjoyed heavy radio rotation.

Due to creative differences with Inzerra and the untimely death of guitarist Lou Lehman, Jay Velez and Jim DeMaria (Heathen) joined and began recording their sophomore album, We're All Gonna Die, with producer Zuess (Rob Zombie, Hatebreed). Shortly after its release, the band embarked on a European tour with fellow Exodus member Lee Altus' band Heathen. The album spawned several successful singles, including "Prophets of War" which went to number one on Sirius Liquid Metal's "Dirty Dozen" and remained one of the top requested songs on the channel.

Following the success of their second album, drummer Robert Youells joined the band and they went into the studio, this time with Ron "Bumblefoot" Thal to record an album with founding member of Run-DMC, Darryl "DMC" McDaniels. The project was initially titled "DMC Generation Kill" before becoming its own entity, later renamed "Fragile Mortals".

Currently, the band is recording the follow up to We're All Gonna Die, teaming up once again with Zuess, and with new member Max Velez on bass, and Rob Youells returning as their drummer. The new album is expected to be released late 2021 and will feature several special guests including longtime friend and former Exodus bandmate Gary Holt.

Influences 

Dukes has stated in interviews that punk rock was his gateway into music in terms of angst and attitude: "it wasn't complicated music like metal was, three chords and scream...I can do that". He also plays guitar, claiming that he was "mediocre" but "having fun" at first, with Randy Rhoads as a huge influence, although it took him a month to learn Rhoads' acoustic piece "Dee" from Ozzy Osbourne's Blizzard of Ozz album.
On his beginnings as a singer, Dukes said: "I found out I could sing sitting in my room with an acoustic. I liked Maiden and Priest but could never sing that well, then I found Metallica, Megadeth, Exodus, S.O.D., Anthrax, Misfits and thought, 'I can sing like that'."

Discography 
With Exodus
Shovel Headed Kill Machine (2005)
The Atrocity Exhibition... Exhibit A (2007)
Let There Be Blood (2008)
Shovel Headed Tour Machine: Live at Wacken & Other Assorted Atrocities (2010)
Exhibit B: The Human Condition (2010)

With Generation Kill
Red, White and Blood (2011)
We're All Gonna Die (2013)

With Fragile Mortals
The Dark Project (2017)

Solo
Dukes EP (2017)

References 

 

1968 births
American male singers
American heavy metal singers
Exodus (American band) members
Living people
People from Nyack, New York
People from Queens, New York
Singers from New York (state)
Thrash metal musicians